Bradford R. Lansing (September 6, 1860 in Niskayuna, Schenectady County, New York – February 4, 1912 in Rensselaer, Rensselaer County, New York) was an American politician from New York.

Life
The family removed in 1870 to the Clinton Heights neighbourhood in the Town of East Greenbush. He married Alice R. Crannell.

He was the first Mayor of the City of Rensselaer, elected upon its incorporation in 1897.

Lansing was a member of the New York State Assembly in 1906, 1907, 1908, 1909, 1910, 1911 and 1912. Due to his illness, he did not take his seat during the session of 1912.

He died on February 4, 1912, at his home in Rensselaer, New York, after an illness of several weeks; and was buried at the Greenbush Cemetery in East Greenbush.

Sources
 Official New York from Cleveland to Hughes by Charles Elliott Fitch (Hurd Publishing Co., New York and Buffalo, 1911, Vol. IV; pg. 352, 354, 356f, 359 and 361)
 New York Red Book (1911, pg. 146)
 Assemblyman B. R. Lansing in NYT on February 5, 1912
 Rensselaer County cemetery records at RootsWeb

1860 births
1912 deaths
Republican Party members of the New York State Assembly
People from Rensselaer, New York
People from Niskayuna, New York
Mayors of places in New York (state)
Politicians from Albany, New York
Politicians from Rensselaer, New York
19th-century American politicians